Lists of borders cover land and maritime borders between countries and territories.

Lists

List of countries and territories by land borders
List of countries and territories by land and maritime borders
List of countries and territories by maritime boundaries
List of international border rivers
List of land borders with dates of establishment
List of political and geographic borders

See also

Boundaries between the continents of Earth
:Category:Border-related lists